The 1979 New Mexico Lobos football team was an American football team that represented the University of New Mexico in the Western Athletic Conference (WAC) during the 1979 NCAA Division I-A football season.  In their sixth and final season under head coach Bill Mondt, the Lobos compiled a 6–6 record (3–4 against WAC opponents) and were outscored by a total of 229 to 211. 

The team's statistical leaders included Casey Miller with 555 passing yards, Jimmy Sayers with 696 rushing yards, Derwin Williams with 250 receiving yards, and kicker Alan Moore with 49 points scored.

Schedule

References

New Mexico
New Mexico Lobos football seasons
New Mexico Lobos football